The 2003 World Mountain Running Championships was the 19th edition of the global mountain running competition, World Mountain Running Championships, organised by the World Mountain Running Association.

Results

Men Senior
Individual

Team

Women Senior
Individual

Team

Medal table (junior events included)

References

External links
 

World Mountain Running Championships
World Long Distance Mountain Running